Amy Elizabeth Richter is an Episcopal priest. She served as rector of St. Anne's Church in Annapolis, Maryland from 2009 until 2018.

Richter received a Ph.D. in New Testament Theology from Marquette University. She holds an M.Div. from Princeton Theological Seminary, an M.T.S. from Harvard Divinity School, a B.A. from Valparaiso University, and a Diploma in Anglican Studies from the General Theological Seminary of the Episcopal Church.

Richter is the author of one book and co-author of two.

Richter was featured in a New York Times article about competing in a bodybuilding competition.

References

Living people
Marquette University alumni
Princeton Theological Seminary alumni
Harvard Divinity School alumni
Valparaiso University alumni
American Episcopal clergy
American religious leaders
People from Racine, Wisconsin
Year of birth missing (living people)